Ryan Anderson (born August 12, 1994) is an American football linebacker who is a free agent. He played college football at Alabama and was drafted by the Washington Redskins in the second round of the 2017 NFL Draft.

Early years
Anderson attended Daphne High School in Daphne, Alabama. He had 75 tackles and 14.5 sacks for the football team during his junior year. As a senior, he had 105 tackles and 12 sacks as a senior. A 4-star recruit, Anderson committed to Alabama to play college football over offers from Illinois, Kentucky, Memphis, South Alabama, South Florida, Tennessee, UAB, and Western Kentucky.

College career
After redshirting his first year at Alabama in 2012, Anderson played in all 13 games in 2013 and had 1.5 sacks. As a sophomore in 2014, he played in all 14 games, recording 25 tackles and three sacks. As a junior in 2015, he had 37 tackles and six sacks. He returned to Alabama for his senior year in 2016. As a senior, Anderson recorded 61 tackles, 8.5 sacks, one interception, three forced fumbles, four fumble recoveries, three pass deflections and a defensive touchdown.

Professional career

Anderson received an invitation to the Senior Bowl, but was unable to play in the game after he dislocated his thumb during the first day of practice. He attended the NFL Combine and decided to not perform the short shuttle, broad jump, bench press, and three-cone drill. Anderson also participated at Alabama's Pro Day, but opted to only perform the three-cone and positional drills. He was projected to be a second to fourth round pick by several analysts.

Washington Redskins / Football Team 
The Washington Redskins selected Anderson in the second round (49th overall) of the 2017 NFL Draft. On May 11, 2017, the Redskins signed Anderson to a four-year, $5.32 million contract with $2.71 million guaranteed and a signing bonus of $2.01 million. Along with being a backup outside linebacker behind starters Ryan Kerrigan and Preston Smith, Anderson took offensive snaps at fullback during his rookie season.

In Week 13 of the 2019 season, Anderson got his first career start against the Carolina Panthers as a replacement for Ryan Kerrigan, who suffered a concussion the previous game. Anderson was ejected in that game due to a helmet-to-helmet hit he inflicted on tight end Greg Olsen. The next game against the Green Bay Packers, he recorded a strip sack against quarterback Aaron Rodgers as well as recovered the fumble. Anderson would be named a starter before Week 15 after Kerrigan was placed on injured reserve. In his second start against the Philadelphia Eagles, Anderson had a dominating performance recording two sacks and three force fumbles. Anderson was placed on injured reserve on December 12, 2020, and left the team via free agency the following offseason.

New York Giants 
Anderson signed a one-year, $1.13 million contract with the New York Giants on March 25, 2021. On August 28, 2021, Anderson was suspended for the first six games of the 2021 season due to violating the NFL's policy on performance enhancing substances. He was released two days later.

Pittsburgh Steelers
On September 13, 2022, the Pittsburgh Steelers signed Anderson to their practice squad. He was promoted to the active roster on October 8. He was released on November 8.

References

External links

New York Giants bio
Alabama Crimson Tide bio

1994 births
Living people
People from Daphne, Alabama
Players of American football from Alabama
American football defensive ends
American football outside linebackers
Alabama Crimson Tide football players
New York Giants players
Washington Redskins players
Washington Football Team players
Pittsburgh Steelers players